USS Devastator (MCM-6) is an  of the United States Navy.

Construction of Devastator began on 9 February 1987 when her keel was laid at Peterson Shipbuilders in Sturgeon Bay, Wisconsin. Construction was finished and the vessel was launched on 11 June 1988.  Devastator was commissioned into the US Navy on 6 October 1990.

References

External links
 Official page

Avenger-class mine countermeasures ships
Minehunters of the United States
1988 ships

Ships built by Peterson Builders